Hentriacontylic acid (also hentriacontanoic acid, henatriacontylic acid, or henatriacontanoic acid) is a carboxylic saturated fatty acid.

Sources
Hentriacontylic acid can be derived from peat wax and montan wax.

The olefin triacontene-1 can be reacted to yield linear n-henatriacontanoic acid.

See also
List of saturated fatty acids

References

External links
Hentriacontylic acid at the Nature Lipidomics Gateway

Fatty acids
Alkanoic acids